The following Confederate Army units and commanders fought in the Battle of Richmond of the American Civil War. The Union order of battle is listed separately.

Abbreviations used

Military rank
 MG = Major General
 BG = Brigadier General
 Col = Colonel
 Ltc = Lieutenant Colonel
 Maj = Major
 Cpt = Captain

Other
 k = killed
 w = wounded

Army of Kentucky

MG E. Kirby Smith
Escort:
 Company A, E, and F; 1st Florida Cavalry: Cpt William M. Footman
 Georgia Cavalry: Cpt Thomas M. Nelson

Troops Attached to Smith's Command [Not Present]
 2d Kentucky Cavalry: Col John Hunt Morgan
 Stevenson's Division: BG Carter L. Stevenson
 Left in Powell Valley, Virginia against Federal forces at Cumberland Gap
 Heth's Division: BG Henry Heth
 En route from Barbourville, Kentucky

See also

 Kentucky in the American Civil War

References
 Lambert, D. Warren.  "When the Ripe Pears Fell:  The Battle of Richmond, Kentucky" (Richmond, KY:  Madison County Historical Society, Inc.), 1996.  

American Civil War orders of battle